The 1963–64 1re série season was the 43rd season of the 1re série, the top level of ice hockey in France. Six teams participated in the final round, and Chamonix Hockey Club won their 20th league title.

Final round

External links
Season on hockeyarchives.info

Fra
1963–64 in French ice hockey
Ligue Magnus seasons